166 Medium Regiment  is an artillery regiment which is part of the Regiment of Artillery of the Indian Army. The war cry of the unit is “Har Maidan Fateh”. It is a Single Class Composition Regiment composed entirely of Sikh gunners.

Formation 
The regiment was raised as a Field Regiment on November 1, 1963 at Jalandhar Cantonment by its first CO, Lt Col (later Maj Gen) Rajeshwar Singh.

History 
The regiment was the first unit to be equipped with the Indian Field Gun. It saw action in the Indo-Pakistani War of 1965 and Indo-Pakistani War of 1971.  It participated in Operation Meghdoot and Operation Parakram (2002).

Nagrota Attack On 29th November 2016, two officers and five soldiers were killed and half a dozen others wounded in a fierce gun battle with a group of heavily armed militants which stormed the Army camp housing the regiment at Nagrota. Among the martyred was Major Gosavi Kunal Mannadir, who was subsequently awarded the Shaurya Chakra.

Operations 
Some of the major operations undertaken by the Regiment include:

Indo-Pakistani War of 1965 As 166 Field Regiment, the regiment provided fire power as part of the XI Corps in the Battle of Chawinda and the Battle of Alhar. Lt Col (later Maj Gen) Rajeshwar Singh was awarded the 'COAS Commendation Card’ and 5 gunners were  Mentioned in Despatches.

Indo-Pakistani War of 1971 The 166 Field Regiment under “F” Sector took part in the defense of  Fazilka.  Lt Col Narinder Singh Rawat and Gnr Ajit Singh  were awarded the Vir Chakra. Capt RS Sodhi and LNk Prakash Singh were  Mentioned in Despatches.

Achievements 
Sub Hardeep Singh was awarded the Arjuna Award in 1992 for Kabbadi, he represented India in the International Kabaddi Tournament in 1984 and 1990, 3rd SAF Games in 1997 and the Asian Games in 1990. His team won Gold in all these events.

See also
 List of artillery regiments of Indian Army

References

External links
 A true soldier (Lieutenant Colonel Narinder Rawat)– USI Journal Oct-Dec 2013

Artillery regiments of the Indian Army after 1947
Military units and formations established in 1963